The 1994 CONCACAF U-20 Tournament was an association football tournament that took place in Honduras in August 1994. It determined the two CONCACAF teams that participated at the 1995 FIFA World Youth Championship.

Venues

Qualification
As in 1992 a qualifying stage was organised for the Caribbean and for the first time as well for Central America. The format was smaller than for the previous tournament, with teams only having to play one or two opponents. 12 Caribbean teams entered, of which 4 qualified in two rounds. 6 Central American teams entered, of which 4 qualified as well, but in one round.

Caribbean

First round

Second round
Four winners from the first round participated here. The Cayman Islands, Guyana, Jamaica and Trinidad and Tobago entered as well.

Central America

Qualified teams
The following teams qualified for the tournament:

1Belize qualified for Central America by achieving the smallest loss

Squads

Group phase

Group A

Group B

Group C

Final phase

Final ranking
Note: Per statistical convention in football, matches decided in extra time are counted as wins and losses, while matches decided by penalty shoot-out are counted as draws.

References

External links
 

1994
U-20
1994 CONCACAF U-20 Tournament
1994 in youth association football